The National High School Mock Trial Championship is an American nationwide competition of high school mock trial teams.  Hundreds, and even thousands of teams participate in district, regional, and state tournaments to select one champion team to represent each of the 50 states.  The competition debuted in 1984 in Des Moines, Iowa, with teams representing Illinois, Iowa, Minnesota, Nebraska and Wisconsin.

Georgia and Iowa have been the most successful states in the competition, each winning the title four separate times. Washington State and Tennessee have won the national championship three times, while California, New Jersey, South Carolina, Indiana, New Mexico, and Arizona have all won twice.

Winners
Past winners and runners-up of the competition include the following schools:

The 2021 and 2022 NHSMTC were held virtually over Zoom because of the COVID-19 pandemic.

Controversy

2005

The Torah Academy of Bergen County from Teaneck, New Jersey had won its state's 2005 competition, but faced difficulties in its ultimately successful effort to gain accommodations to participate in the National High School Mock Trial Championship in Charlotte, North Carolina without being required to compete during the Jewish Sabbath.

The American Mock Trial Invitational was created in 2006 by the New Jersey State Bar Foundation and the North Carolina Academy of Trial Lawyers as an alternative competition to address concerns of religious commitments by competing school teams.

2009

Maimonides School of Brookline, Massachusetts won the 2009 Massachusetts state championship and desired to participate in the national championship in Atlanta, Georgia. Due to religious dietary restrictions and Shabbat observance the school asked for accommodation in order to participate without violating their religious beliefs. The school asked for two trials to be changed from Saturday to Thursday or Friday in order to avoid violating Shabbat. In response the school obtained attorney Nathan Lewin to represent the school. Lewin filed a complaint with the US Department of Justice alleging religious discrimination and a violation of civil rights. Attorney Elizabeth Price resigned from the Georgia State Bar in protest over the National Board refusing to grant the requests for accommodation. The Anti-Defamation League sent a letter of protest to the National Board complaining against the lack of reasonable accommodation, asking the National Board not to punish children for their religious beliefs. The United States Congress condemned the National Board for failing to provide for these accommodations. On May 7, 2009, Fulton County Superior Court Chief Judge Doris Downs ruled that unless the competition would accommodate the Orthodox Jewish students, then the courthouse would not be allowed to be used for the competition.

References

External links
2014 National High School Mock Trial Championship
National High School Mock Trial Championship

Recurring events established in 1984
Legal education in the United States
Intellectual competitions
Annual events in the United States